Alejandro Andrés Figueroa Irribarra (born 11 May 1980) is a Chilean retired footballer.

His last club was Lota Schwager.

References
 
 

1980 births
Living people
Chilean footballers
Ñublense footballers
Lota Schwager footballers
C.D. Huachipato footballers
Provincial Osorno footballers
Deportes Concepción (Chile) footballers
Deportes Temuco footballers
Santiago Wanderers footballers
Chilean Primera División players
Primera B de Chile players
Association football midfielders